Mark Isherwood may refer to:

 Mark Isherwood (ice hockey) (born 1989), Canadian ice hockey defenceman 
 Mark Isherwood (politician) (born 1959), Conservative politician